Bill Grant (1 December 1882 – 1 January 1947) was a former Australian rules footballer who played with Carlton in the Victorian Football League (VFL).

Notes

External links 
		
Bill Grant's profile at Blueseum

Australian rules footballers from Victoria (Australia)
Carlton Football Club players
1882 births
1947 deaths